Atractus roulei, Roule's ground snake, is a species of snake in the family Colubridae. The species can be found in Ecuador and Peru.

References 

Atractus
Reptiles of Ecuador
Reptiles of Peru
Snakes of South America
Reptiles described in 1910